Nättrabyån is a river in Sweden. It flows through the village of Nättraby and drains into the Baltic Sea in the area of the Blekinge archipelago.

References

Rivers of Sweden